The David J. and Maggie Jones House is located in Dodgeville, Wisconsin.

History
The house was built for J.C. Hocking, a Cornish immigrant, miner and businessman. It was later occupied by David J. Jones, a Welsh immigrant, Civil War veteran, miner, and real estate speculator. The house was added to the State and the National Register of Historic Places in 1994.

References

Houses on the National Register of Historic Places in Wisconsin
National Register of Historic Places in Iowa County, Wisconsin
Houses in Iowa County, Wisconsin
Italianate architecture in Wisconsin
Houses completed in 1878